Pyxis is a genus of tortoise in the family Testudinidae. 
It contains the following species:
 Flat-backed spider tortoise (Pyxis planicauda)
 Spider tortoise (Pyxis arachnoides)

References

 
Turtle genera
Taxa named by Thomas Bell (zoologist)